A fail-safe describes a device which, if or when it fails, will cause a minimum of harm.

Fail-safe may also refer to:

Fail-Safe (novel), a 1962 novel about an accidental sortie of American nuclear bombers against the USSR
Fail Safe (1964 film), a 1964 film, based on the novel, directed by Sidney Lumet
Fail Safe (2000 film), a 2000 made-for-television drama, based on the novel, starring George Clooney

Fail-Safe Investing, a 1999 finance book by Harry Browne
 Failsafe (UK band), a Preston-based punk rock band
 "Failsafe", a song first recorded by The Choir Practice and that appeared on the New Pornographers album Challengers
 "Fail Safe" (Stargate SG-1), an episode of the science fiction television series
 "Fail-Safe" (Legends of Tomorrow), an episode of Legends of Tomorrow